Essen-Dellwig station is located in the city of Essen in the German state of North Rhine-Westphalia on the Duisburg–Dortmund railway, opened by the Cologne-Minden Railway Company on 15 May 1847. The station opened on 1 May 1891. It is classified by Deutsche Bahn as a category 6 station. The station is located 300m away from Essen-Dellwig Ost station.

The station is served by Regionalbahn services RB 32 (Rhein-Emscher-Bahn) and RB 35 (Emscher-Niederrhein-Bahn), providing a service every 30 minutes during the day on weekdays.

It is also served by tram lines 103 of the Essen Stadtbahn, operated at 10-minute intervals and bus routes 166 and 185, operated by Ruhrbahn at 20-minute intervals.

References

Rhine-Ruhr S-Bahn stations
S2 (Rhine-Ruhr S-Bahn)
Dellwig
Railway stations in Germany opened in 1891